Chedwel is a small community in Chautauqua County, New York, United States, on the north shore of Chautauqua Lake, about halfway between Bemus Point and Mayville, between State Route 430 and the lake. It is at an elevation of 1335 ft (407 m) above sea level.

History

The area gained its name as the estate of Dr. Charles Edgar Welch (hence Ch-ed-wel), youngest son of Dr. Thomas Bramwell Welch, who pioneered the development of unfermented grape juice as a drink. Charles Edgar, who shared his father's profession of dentistry, became involved in the grape juice enterprise as a young man, and began to run the Vineland, New Jersey, business independently in 1875. Within two decades, he founded the Welch's Grape Juice Company, and in 1897 relocated it to Westfield, New York, on the shores of Lake Erie just a few miles northwest of the tip of Chautauqua Lake. The estate at Chedwel included two main houses built by the Welchs, with adjacent cottages for guests, a tennis court, and a croquet court.  Charles Edgar Welch was, among other things, six-time mayor of Westfield, a New York State gubernatorial candidate in 1916, and a trustee of Chautauqua Institution, located directly across the lake from Chedwel. The property was parceled and sold by the mid-twentieth century.  The community presently includes, besides the former Welch domiciles, several other homes built along its two streets, Chedwel Road and Overlook Avenue.

One of the original buildings was a large log cabin. The interior of the cabin, including the accessories, was built entirely from logs and branches of trees. The beds, light fixtures, towel racks, door openers, even the toilet paper holders, are made from logs and tree branches. These pieces were gathered by the brother of Elbert Hubbard, of Roycroft fame, who spent untold hours walking through the woods looking for branches of just the right shape for various purposes in the cabin.

See also
Thomas Bramwell Welch
Welch's
Grape juice
Ellery, New York

References

External links
"Charles Edgar Welch" in The History of New York State
"Milestones in the History of Welch's"
"Milestones: Jan. 18, 1926". Time. January 18, 1926. Obituary of Charles Edgar Welch.

Hamlets in New York (state)
Hamlets in Chautauqua County, New York